Works entitled Treatise on Logic may refer to the following:
 Lubābu l-Muhassal, a work by Ibn Khaldūn, which was published in English as Treatise on Logic;
 A Treatise on Logic, a Nineteenth Century work by Francis Bowen;
 Sharh-i Manzumah (A Treatise on Logic in Verse), a book by Hadi Sabzavari;
 Summa Totius Logicae (Treatise on all Logic), a book by philosopher William of Ockham;
 Tractatus Minor Logicae (Lesser Treatise on Logic), a work attributed to William of Ockham.

Treatises